Alexander Seton   was Archdeacon of Aghadoe from 25 August 1790 until his death in 1797.

References

Alumni of Trinity College Dublin
Archdeacons of Aghadoe
1797 deaths
18th-century Irish Anglican priests